Turbo reevii is a species of sea snail, a marine gastropod mollusk, in the family Turbinidae.

References

reevii
Gastropods described in 1847